Social Democratic Workers' Party may refer to one of the following parties:

Social Democratic Workers' Party (Netherlands)
Social Democratic Workers' Party of Austria
Social Democratic Workers' Party of Germany
Latvian Social Democratic Workers' Party
Estonian Social Democratic Workers' Party
Russian Social Democratic Labour Party
Swedish Social Democratic Workers' Party